Ode to Gallantry is a Chinese television series adapted from Louis Cha's novel of the same title. The series was first broadcast on NMTV in China in 2002.

Cast

 Wu Jian as Shi Potian / Shi Zhongyu
 Zhou Li as Ding Dang
 Deng Jiajia as Shi Jian
 Ji Qilin as Shi Qing
 Han Yueqiao as Min Rou
 Zhang Yanmin as A'xiu
 Tong Youxun as Bei Haishi
 Zhang Guangzheng as Bai Zizai
 Li Xiaobo as Ding Busi
 Su Tingshi as Ding Busan
 Ba Tu as Xie Yanke
 Guo Jun as Bai Wanjian
 Shan Lianli as Hua Wanzi
 Zhang Shan as Feng Wanli
 Wu Mengjiang as Chen Chongzhi
 Li Zhonglin as Mi Hengye
 Fan Yanhua as Shi Popo
 Tan Jianchang as Zhan Fei
 Li Zongqiang as Qiu Shanfeng
 Bu He as Master Bu
 Hua Zi as Gui
 Jia Zhaoji as Chong
 Tong Xiaohu as Zhang San
 Kong Qingsan as Li Si
 Yang Xin as Huanhuan Lele
 Ma Junle as Mei Fanggu
 Li Yunjuan Gao Sanniangzi
 Heilong as Fengliang
 Cao Tuxin as Fan Yifei
 Li Baowei as Lü Zhengping
 Shao Wanlin as Island master Long
 Shu Yaoxuan as Island master Mu
 Wang Delong as Laojintian
 Wang Limin as Xiaojintian
 Wu Jiayi as Tianxu / Liu Yishou
 Xu Ming as Chongxu
 Zeng Yuanyuan as Xiaoyu
 Liu Lu as Gouzazhong
 Guo Zi as Jianzi Bangzhu
 Sun Ning as Li Jiecheng
 Li Ming as Bull-head
 Liu Bin as Horse-face
 Sang Lin as Sun Wannian
 Huang Jingyi as Liao Zili
 Sheng Ning as Geng Wanzhong
 Xu Jiuru as Qi Zimian
 Zhang Fengming as Cheng Lixue
 Zhao Xiaoqi as Liang Ziqin
 Chen Qitai as Wu Daotong
 Ma Hong as Zhou Mu
 Guo Zhu as Ma Cheng
 Tian Min as Zhan's wife
 Yuan Hongqi as Dabei Old Man
 Wang Fang as Kexin
 Sun Yantong as young Zhang San

See also
 Ode to Gallantry (film)
 Ode to Gallantry (1985 TV series)
 Ode to Gallantry (1989 TV series)

Works based on Ode to Gallantry
Chinese wuxia television series
2002 Chinese television series debuts
2002 Chinese television series endings
Mandarin-language television shows
Television shows based on works by Jin Yong